N-ethylmaleimide-sensitive factor Attachment Protein Alpha, also known as SNAP-α, is a SNAP protein that is involved in the intra-cellular trafficking and fusing of vesicles to target membranes in cells.

Function 

The 'SNARE hypothesis' is a model explaining the process of docking and fusion of vesicles to their target membranes. According to this model, membrane proteins from the vesicle (v-SNAREs) and proteins from the target membrane (t-SNAREs) govern the specificity of vesicle targeting and docking through mutual recognition. Once the 2 classes of SNAREs bind to each other, they form a complex that recruits the general elements of the fusion apparatus, namely NSF (N-ethylmaleimide-sensitive factor) and SNAPs (soluble NSF-attachment proteins), to the site of membrane fusion, thereby forming the 20S fusion complex. Alpha- and gamma-SNAP are found in a wide range of tissues and act synergistically in intra-Golgi transport. The sequence of the predicted 295-amino acid human protein encoded by NAPA shares 37%, 60%, and 67% identity with the sequences of yeast, Drosophila, and squid alpha-SNAP, respectively. Platelets contain some of the same proteins, including NSF, p115/TAP, alpha-SNAP (this protein), gamma-SNAP, and the t-SNAREs syntaxin-2 and syntaxin-4, that are used in many vesicular transport processes in other cell types. Platelet exocytosis uses a molecular mechanism similar to that used by other secretory cells, such as neurons, although the proteins used by the platelet and their modes of regulation may be quite different.

Clinical significance 

NAPA is abnormally expressed in fetuses of both IVF and ICSI, which may contribute to the increased risk of birth defects in these methods of assisted reproductive technology (ART).

Interactions 

NAPA has been shown to interact with:
 NSF, 
 SNAP23, 
 STX1A, 
 STX4,
 STX5.
  ORAI1, STIM1.

References

Further reading 

 
 
 
 
 
 
 
 
 
 
 
 
 
 
 
 
 
 

Human proteins